Tsifota is a coastal fishing village on the west coast of Madagascar. It lies north of Toliara and Manombo and south of Tsiandamba. It is surrounded by the Ifaty Forest.

References

Populated coastal places in Madagascar
Populated places in Atsimo-Andrefana